Bulgar (Bolğar) is a rural locality (a village) in Chekmagushevsky District, Bashkortostan, Russia. The population was 46 as of 2010. There is 1 street.

Geography 
Bulgar is located 16 km east of Chekmagush (the district's administrative centre) by road. Starokalmashevo is the nearest rural locality.

References 

Rural localities in Chekmagushevsky District